Alfonso María Dastis Quecedo (born October 5, 1955) is a Spanish diplomat, who served as Minister of Foreign Affairs of Spain from 2016 until 1 June 2018, when a vote of no-confidence against Mariano Rajoy ousted the government. Prior to becoming Minister he held several positions within the Spanish Diplomatic Corps. He is the current Ambassador of Spain to the Republic of Italy.

Education
Dastis studied law at the CEU San Pablo University in the 1970s, then attended the public Complutense University of Madrid. He embarked on a doctoral thesis on the freedom of establishment of insurance companies, but abandoned it in 1983.

Career

Dastis entered the Diplomatic Corps in 1983. As a career diplomat he held several positions linked to the Ministry of Foreign Affairs and to international institutions, such as in the Spanish Embassy to the UN, the Minister's Staff, and the Prime Minister's Office. In 2002, he was named Secretary General for European Affairs.

Between 1987 and 1989, Dastis worked as a law clerk for one of his former professors, Gil Carlos Rodríguez Iglesias, Spain's first judge at the European Court of Justice (ECJ) and a subsequent president of that court.

As Spain's legal adviser at the United Nations, Dastis deputised occasionally for Spain's ambassador in 1993-94 when Spain held a seat on the United Nations Security Council and cast Spain's vote at the Security Council meeting that accepted the Czech Republic and Slovakia as members after they had split.
Dastis was EU adviser to José Maria Aznar from 1996 to 2000. Among other things, he was in charge of organising Spain's presidency of the Council of the European Union, which ran in the first half of 2002. At the end of 2001, Aznar nominated him as Spanish delegate to the Convention on the Future of Europe, alongside Ana de Palacio y del Valle-Lersundi. In this capacity, he pushed against making the Union's common foreign and security policy (CFSP) subject to the jurisdiction of the ECJ.

Dastis attained the rank of Ambassador in 2004 being named Ambassador to the Netherlands. In 2011 Dastis was named Permanent Representative to the European Union. In 2016 Dastis was named Minister of Foreign Affairs in the second Rajoy government.

During the 2017-18 Spanish constitutional crisis, Dastis claimed in an interview with BBC News that several videos purporting to show clashes during the 1 October Catalan independence referendum were fake, and defended the actions of the Civil Guard and National Police.

Personal life
Dastis is married to a lawyer. He is a keen golfer.

See also
List of foreign ministers in 2017

References

External links

 Ministry of Foreign Affairs

1955 births
Living people
Politicians from Andalusia
Foreign ministers of Spain
People from Jerez de la Frontera
Ambassadors of Spain to the Netherlands
Ambassadors of Spain to Italy
Grand Crosses of the Order of the Sun of Peru